John Warwick Hester (1 July 1922 – 24 March 1999) was an Australian rules footballer who played with Hawthorn in the Victorian Football League (VFL).

Prior to playing with Hawthorn, Hester served as a member of the 24th Battalion (Australia) in World War II.

Notes

External links 

1922 births
1999 deaths
Australian rules footballers from Melbourne
Hawthorn Football Club players
People from Hawthorn, Victoria
Australian military personnel of World War I
Military personnel from Melbourne